Yefanovo is a rural locality (a village) in Kiprevskoye Rural Settlement, Kirzhachsky District, Vladimir Oblast, Russia. The population was 29 as of 2010. There are 2 streets.

Geography 
Yefanovo is located on the Vakhchilka River, 5 km east of Kirzhach (the district's administrative centre) by road. Kirzhach is the nearest rural locality.

References 

Rural localities in Kirzhachsky District